Willem Gerrit "Wim" van der Gijp (23 October 1928 – 19 March 2005) was a Dutch football player and manager. He gained one cap for the Netherlands national team in 1954.

Football career
Van der Gijp started his football career alongside his younger brother Cor, at Emma in Dordrecht. In 1954, two months after his brother had made his debut, he was called up for the Netherlands national team. On 30 May 1954, he gained his only international cap in Zürich against Switzerland, which was lost 3–1. After entering professional football, Van der Gijp moved to Sparta, where he came to play in midfield. Van der Gijp would play at Sparta until 1960, where he would score 43 goals in 150 games. In 1959, Van der Gijp won the national title with Sparta. After his professional career, Van der Gijp played at amateur level for DHC from Delft. 

After his active football career, Van der Gijp turned to his profession as a stamp draftsman. He was also active as a manager at various amateur clubs. In 1971, he won the Dutch national amateur championship with Zwart-Wit '28. He later also coached SV Gouda, missing out on the Eerste Klasse title in 1972.

Personal life
His son René was born in 1961, who would also be capped by the Netherlands.

Wim van der Gijp died on 19 March 2005 of cardiac arrest.

Honours

Player
Sparta
 Eredivisie: 1958–59

Manager
Zwart-Wit '28
 National Amateur Championship: 1971

References

External links
 

1928 births
2005 deaths
Dutch footballers
Netherlands international footballers
Footballers from Dordrecht
Association football midfielders
SC Emma players
Sparta Rotterdam players
DHC Delft players
Dutch football managers
Zwart-Wit '28 managers
Eredivisie players